The Triathle (as Beach Modern Pentathlon) competition at the 2014 Asian Beach Games was held in Phuket, Thailand from 20 to 21 November 2014 at Naiyang Beach, Phuket.

Triathle is a new development initiative by UIPM where athletes compete in a shoot swim run competition.

Medalists

Medal table

Results

Men's individual
20 November

Women's individual
20 November

Mixed relay
21 November

 Kazakhstan was awarded bronze because of no more than one medal per country rule.

References

External links 
Official website
Tournament summary

2014 Asian Beach Games events
Asian Beach Games